The 2008 Camping World RV 400, was the twenty-eighth race of the 2008 NASCAR Sprint Cup season and the second race in the ten-race Chase for the Sprint Cup. The  race was held on Sunday, September 21 at the  Dover International Speedway in Dover, Delaware, the city that serves as state capital of the First State. ABC telecast the race beginning at 1 PM US EDT and MRN along with Sirius Satellite Radio provided radio coverage starting at 1:15 PM US EDT.

Pre-Race news
Patrick Carpentier is officially a free agent after Gillett Evernham Motorsports could not find sponsorship for 2009.  It will be more than likely that Reed Sorenson, who was signed away from Chip Ganassi Racing will take over the #10 car next season. In other GEM news, it was announced that Robby Gordon Motorsports will merge with the Gillett Evernham Motorsports organization for the 2009 season, this two weeks after GEM sued Robby Gordon's team in a dispute over the terms. Obviously, the suit will be dropped with the merger.
NASCAR officially introduced a new random drug testing policy among all drivers, over-the-wall crew members and even race officials, effective with the 2009 season.  This new policy will put the stock car racing organization on the same level as the major "ball-and-stick" sports.

Qualifying
Jeff Gordon took the pole, with Mark Martin starting alongside.

OP: qualified via owners points

PC: qualified as past champion

PR: provisional

QR: via qualifying race

* - had to qualify on time

Failed to qualify: Chad Chaffin (#34), Johnny Sauter (#08), Stanton Barrett (#50).

Race Recap
Hard times continued for the top seed in the Chase, Kyle Busch, finished dead last and fell from eighth to 12th in the Chase.  Roush Fenway Racing swept the top three spots as Greg Biffle, who had been winless entering the Chase, won his second straight race, winning last week in New Hampshire. Teammates Matt Kenseth and Carl Edwards followed Biffle.

Results

References

Camping World RV 400
Camping World RV 400
NASCAR races at Dover Motor Speedway